Pere Milla Peña (born 23 September 1992) is a Spanish professional footballer who plays for La Liga club Elche as a winger.

Club career
Born in Lleida, Catalonia, Milla graduated from UE Lleida's youth setup. After the club's dissolution he was assigned to Lleida Esportiu, being promoted to the first team and making his senior debuts in the 2011–12 campaign, in Segunda División B.

On 11 June 2014, Milla moved to Getafe CF, being assigned to the reserves also in the third level. On 14 January of the following year he played his first match with the main squad, starting in a 1–0 home win against UD Almería, for the campaign's Copa del Rey.

On 20 July 2015, Milla signed a one-year deal with UD Logroñés. On 20 June 2016, after scoring a career-best 18 goals, he joined La Liga side SD Eibar, being loaned to UCAM Murcia CF on 2 August.

Milla scored his first professional goal on 22 April 2017, netting the winner in a 2–1 away success over Girona FC. On 6 July he moved to fellow second division club CD Numancia, on loan for one year.

Ahead of the 2018–19 campaign, Milla returned to the Armeros and was assigned to the first-team. He made his top tier debut on 24 August 2018, starting in a 0–2 away loss against former side Getafe. On 15 June of the following year, after appearing rarely, he signed a contract with Elche CF in the second division.

On 23 August 2020, Milla came off the bench to score Elche's winning goal in the play-offs Final against Girona FC, taking his side back to the top tier after five years.

Career statistics

References

External links

1992 births
Living people
Sportspeople from Lleida
Footballers from Catalonia
Spanish footballers
Association football wingers
La Liga players
Segunda División players
Segunda División B players
Lleida Esportiu footballers
Getafe CF B players
Getafe CF footballers
UD Logroñés players
SD Eibar footballers
UCAM Murcia CF players
CD Numancia players
Elche CF players
Catalonia international footballers